Maxanapis is a genus of Australian araneomorph spiders in the family Anapidae, first described by Norman I. Platnick & Raymond Robert Forster in 1989.

Species
 it contains nine species:
Maxanapis bartle Platnick & Forster, 1989 – Australia (Queensland)
Maxanapis bell Platnick & Forster, 1989 – Australia (Queensland)
Maxanapis bellenden Platnick & Forster, 1989 – Australia (Queensland)
Maxanapis burra (Forster, 1959) – Australia (Queensland, New South Wales)
Maxanapis crassifemoralis (Wunderlich, 1976) – Australia (Queensland, New South Wales)
Maxanapis dorrigo Platnick & Forster, 1989 – Australia (New South Wales)
Maxanapis mossman Platnick & Forster, 1989 – Australia (Queensland)
Maxanapis tenterfield Platnick & Forster, 1989 – Australia (Queensland, New South Wales)
Maxanapis tribulation Platnick & Forster, 1989 – Australia (Queensland)

References

Anapidae
Araneomorphae genera
Spiders of Australia
Taxa named by Raymond Robert Forster